Senator Lawrence may refer to:

Edward A. Lawrence (1831–1883), New York State Senate
George P. Lawrence (1859–1917), Massachusetts State Senate
George Van Eman Lawrence (1818–1904), Pennsylvania State Senate
John L. Lawrence (1785–1849), New York State Senate
Jonathan Lawrence (1737–1812), New York State Senate
Keith Lawrence (politician) (1891–1978), Ohio State Senate
Mark Lawrence (politician) (born 1958), Maine State Senate
Myron Lawrence (1799–1852), Massachusetts State Senate
Sidney Lawrence (1801–1892), New York State Senate
William A. Lawrence (Wisconsin politician) (1822–1890), Wisconsin State Senate
William Lawrence (Ohio Democrat) (1814–1895), Ohio State Senate
William Lawrence (Ohio Republican) (1819–1899), Ohio State Senate